Anton Uesson (12 January 1879 – 13 April 1942) was an Estonian politician and engineer.

Early life and career
Born in Haimre Parish, Kreis Wiek, Governorate of Estonia (now Rapla County, Estonia), he was the son of Jaan Uesson and Ann Uesson (née Mänd). He was one of eight siblings. Uesson graduated from the Theological Seminary in Riga, present-day Latvia in 1902. In 1910, he finished his studies at the Riga Polytechnic Institute, graduating cum laude with a degree as a civil engineer. He began his career as an architect and engineer by constructing many of Tallinn's Jugendstil buildings in the 1910s, working for Tallinn's then-mayor Voldemar Lender. By the spring of 1912, Uesson was constructing over 40 houses in the capital city.

Politics
In 1917 Uesson was a founding member and member of the board of trustees of the Estonian Technical Society. In 1919, Anton Uesson was elected the Deputy Mayor of Tallinn; a post which he held until 1934, when he became deputy mayor, which post was renamed mayor since 1 May 1938.

In 1928, when the Tallinn city government learned that Herbert Hoover had been elected the United States president, Anton Uesson sent Hoover a congratulatory telegram. Hoover had previously, in 1920, been elected an Honorary Citizen of Tallinn. On 4 December Vaba Maa reported on President-elect Hoover's gracious response to Uesson from California.

Death
On 14 June 1941, during the Soviet invasion of Estonia in World War II, Uesson was arrested by the NKVD, along with many other prominent Estonian politicians and intellectuals. He was sent to a gulag in Yekaterinburg, 
Sverdlovsk oblast and executed by gunshot on 13 April 1942.

Achievements
1917, Estonian Engineering Society, a founder and first chairman.
1918–1919, Founding member of the Tallinn Technical School and a member of the board of trustees.  
1920–1922, I EV Riigikogu. 
1920–1940, The Paramilitaries Endowment Committee Chairman. 
1920–1940, Chair of the Board of the Association of Estonian Cities. 
1935–1940, Engineering's Chairman Committee. 
1937, Member of the Estonian National Assembly (Rahvuskogu). 
1938–1940, National Council (Riiginõukogu) member.

Awards
1928 Order of the Estonian Red Cross, Class I Grade II
1930, Order of the Cross of the Eagle, Class III
1934 Memorial in the Estonian Red Cross, Class II Grade I
1938 Order of the White Star, Class II

Quotes

– Anton Uesson, 1938

References

External links
Tallinna Tehnikaülikooli Raamatukogu (Tallinn Technical School)

Further reading
Linnapea A. Uesson 60-aastane. Uus Eesti, 12 January 1939, no. 11. pp 6.

1879 births
1942 deaths
People from Märjamaa Parish
People from Kreis Wiek
Estonian Labour Party politicians
Members of the Riigikogu, 1920–1923
Members of the Riiginõukogu
Members of the Estonian National Assembly
Mayors of Tallinn
Art Nouveau architects
Riga Technical University alumni
Recipients of the Military Order of the Cross of the Eagle
Recipients of the Order of the White Star, 2nd Class
People executed by the Soviet Union by firearm
Estonian people executed by the Soviet Union
People who died in the Gulag